Nowkand Kola Rural District is a rural district (dehestan) in the Central District of Qaem Shahr County, Mazandaran Province, Iran. At the 2006 census, its population was 25,941, in 6,870 families. The rural district has 31 villages.

References 

Rural Districts of Mazandaran Province
Qaem Shahr County